Oleksiy Mustafin (born 23 May 1971) is a Ukrainian media-manager, journalist, and politician. 

Born in Kyiv, in the Ukrainian SSR of the Soviet Union (in present-day Ukraine), Mustafin graduated from the Kyiv Pedagogical University, which he attended from 1988 to 1993.

Since 1993 Mustafin has been working as journalist of the UNIAN-weekly, Post-Postup and Den newspapers. From 1994 to 1997 he was a reporter on the weekly television show “Pislyamova” where he was also editor-in-chief and anchor from 2003 to 2004. Other media activities include head of the world news department for 1+1 TV channel in 1997, and deputy-chief and chief-editor positions for  Inter TV channel from 1998 to 2001. Since January, 2006 Mustafin has been chief–editor for STB TV channel.

References

1971 births
Ukrainian journalists
Ukrainian television journalists
Living people